1392 Pierre, provisional designation , is a dark, dynamical Eunomian asteroid from the central regions of the asteroid belt, approximately  in diameter. It was discovered on 16 March 1936, by astronomer Louis Boyer at the Algiers Observatory in Algeria, North Africa. The asteroid was named after the discoverer's nephew, Pierre.

Orbit and classification 

Pierre is a dynamical member of the Eunomia family, a prominent family of stony asteroids and the largest one in the intermediate main belt with more than 5,000 members. Pierres spectral type is different from that of the Eunomia family (see below) and possibly an interloper rather than a true family member. When applying the hierarchical clustering method to its proper orbital elements, Pierre is a non-family asteroid of the main belt's background population.

It orbits the Sun in the central main-belt at a distance of 2.1–3.1 AU once every 4 years and 3 months (1,538 days). Its orbit has an eccentricity of 0.20 and an inclination of 12° with respect to the ecliptic. The body's observation arc begins with its official discovery observation at Algiers in March 1936.

Naming 

This minor planet was named after Pierre, a nephew of the discoverer Louis Boyer. The official  was mentioned in The Names of the Minor Planets by Paul Herget in 1955.

Physical characteristics 

Pierre has been characterized as a carbonaceous C-type asteroid by Pan-STARRS photometric survey. In the Tholen classification, the asteroid's spectral type is ambiguous, closest to a dark D-type and somewhat similar to a generic X-type asteroid. Conversely, the Eunomia family consists of S-type asteroids.

Rotation period 

In August 1984, a first rotational lightcurve of Pierre was obtained from photometric observations with the ESO 1-metre telescope at the La Silla Observatory in Chile. Lightcurve analysis gave a rotation period of 18 hours with a brightness variation of 0.09 magnitude. A poorly rated lightcurve by Pierre Antonini in Januar 2007, gave a period of 24 hours with an amplitude of 0.05 magnitude.

Diameter and albedo 

According to the surveys carried out by the Infrared Astronomical Satellite IRAS, the Japanese Akari satellite and the NEOWISE mission of NASA's Wide-field Infrared Survey Explorer, Pierre measures between 26.16 and 28.94 kilometers in diameter and its surface has an albedo between 0.04 and 0.054. The Collaborative Asteroid Lightcurve Link adopts the results obtained by IRAS, that is, an albedo of 0.0519 and a diameter of 26.44 kilometers based on an absolute magnitude of 11.72.

References

External links 
 Asteroid Lightcurve Database (LCDB), query form (info )
 Dictionary of Minor Planet Names, Google books
 Asteroids and comets rotation curves, CdR – Observatoire de Genève, Raoul Behrend
 Discovery Circumstances: Numbered Minor Planets (1)-(5000) – Minor Planet Center
 
 

001392
Discoveries by Louis Boyer (astronomer)
Named minor planets
001392
19360316